Nonoalco (1971–1992) was an American-bred Thoroughbred racehorse who raced in France.

Background
He was out of the mare Seximee, a daughter of the 1954 Preakness Stakes winner Hasty Road. His sire was the very important Nearctic, who also sired Northern Dancer, the 1964 Kentucky Derby, Preakness Stakes and Queen's Plate winner, who became the most influential sire of the 20th century.

Nonoalco was bred by American chocolate magnate Forrest Mars, whose mother Ethel V. Mars was a major Thoroughbred owner/breeder through her Milky Way Farm. Nonoalco was purchased and raced by María Félix, a Mexican actress and wife of French financier Alex Berger.

Racing career
Trained by François Boutin, at age two Nonoalco had an outstanding year in racing. He won the Prix Yacowlef, Prix Morny and the Prix de la Salamandre, plus he finished second in the Grand Critérium to Nelson Bunker Hunt's colt, Mississipian.

As a three-year-old, he won the British Classic, the 2000 Guineas at Newmarket Racecourse, beating the odds-on favourite Apalachee into third place. In France, he captured the Prix du Rond Point and the Prix Jacques Le Marois.

Stud career
Retired to stud having won four Group One races, Nonoalco stood in France in 1975 and in Ireland from 1976 through 1981 before being shipped to Japan, where he stood until his death at age twenty-one in 1992. His offspring included Noalcoholic and Katies.

Pedigree

References

1971 racehorse births
1992 racehorse deaths
Racehorses bred in Virginia
Racehorses trained in France
Thoroughbred family 2-s
2000 Guineas winners